Khaan Khuns Titem FC was a football club from the Mongolian capital Ulaanbaatar, which last played in the Mongolian Premier League. The club was established in 2008 and sponsored by Mongolian national food factory Khaan Khuns LLC. It was merged with Erchim FC for the 2020 season.

History
The club was founded in 2008 as Black Morgan. It competed in the inaugural season of the Mongolian 1st League in 2015 as Khangarid City FC. The club finished second that season and earned promotion to the Mongolian Premier League for the 2016 season. However, it sold its Premier League license to the IT Group which used it to place Ulaanbaatar City FC in the league.

Domestic history

References

External links
Mongolian Football Federation profile

Football clubs in Mongolia
Association football clubs established in 2008
2008 establishments in Mongolia
Association football clubs disestablished in 2019
Defunct association football clubs